The 63rd edition of the Vuelta a Colombia was held from 9 to 23 June 2013. It was won by the Spanish cyclist Óscar Sevilla.

References

Vuelta a Colombia
Colombia
Vuelta Colombia